AS-34 may be:

 USS Canopus (AS-34), United States Navy tender ship
 Russian submarine AS-34, Russian Navy Priz class rescue sub
 AS.34 Kormoran, German anti-ship missile